Sthefany Thomas Díaz (born 4 May 1989) is an Argentine basketball player who plays as a forward. She has been a member of the Argentina women's national team at under–18 (2006), under–19 (2007) and senior (2008–2016) levels.

She is the daughter of Jim Thomas, an American former basketball player, and an Argentine mother. She was born in Temuco, Chile, while his father was playing there. She was initially raised in Argentina and then in the United States. She attended the Clemson University.

Her brother Erik Thomas is also a basketball player.

Clemson statistics 

Source

References

External links
Sthefany Thomas at the Argentine Basketball Federation website 

1989 births
Living people
Forwards (basketball)
Argentine women's basketball players
Pan American Games competitors for Argentina
Basketball players at the 2015 Pan American Games
Competitors at the 2014 South American Games
Argentine people of African-American descent
American women's basketball players
Basketball players from Florida
Sportspeople from the Tampa Bay area
People from Wesley Chapel, Florida
African-American basketball players
American people of Argentine descent
Clemson Tigers women's basketball players
Argentine people of American descent
Afro-Argentine sportspeople
21st-century African-American sportspeople
20th-century African-American people
20th-century African-American women
21st-century African-American women